Svetlana Mikhailovna Vasilyeva (born July 24, 1992 is a Russian race walker. She won the 2011 Russian Winter Walking Championships in Sochi in the 10000 m track walk with a time of 42:43. The mark was not ratified as a world junior record as it was hand-timed. In August 2017, the All-Russia Athletic Federation announced that Vasilyeva had received a four year ban for doping violations, to be applied from 13 December 2016 onwards. She was also stripped of her previous results from 18 October 2011 until 14 July 2013 and 24 May until 12 December 2016.

Competition record

References

External links

1992 births
Living people
Russian female racewalkers
21st-century Russian women